Satsa is a village in Kochas Block in Rohtas District of Bihar State, India. It's come under Balathari Panchayat.

Villages in Rohtas district